Pedro Orlando Reyes (born 23 February 1959) is a retired Cuban amateur boxer. He won gold medals at the 1983 Pan American Games and 1986 World Championships, placing second in 1989. He could not compete in the 1984 and 1988 Olympics due to their boycott by Cuba. His son Rudy became a baseball player.

References

1959 births
Living people
Boxers from Havana
Cuban male boxers
Boxers at the 1983 Pan American Games
Pan American Games gold medalists for Cuba
Pan American Games medalists in boxing
Competitors at the 1986 Central American and Caribbean Games
Central American and Caribbean Games gold medalists for Cuba
AIBA World Boxing Championships medalists
Flyweight boxers
Central American and Caribbean Games medalists in boxing
Medalists at the 1983 Pan American Games
20th-century Cuban people